Eugonatonotus is a genus of decapods and is the only genus in the monotypic family Eugonatonotidae.

The species of this genus are found in Central America, Southeastern Asia and Australia.

Species:

Eugonatonotus chacei Chan & Yu, 1991
Eugonatonotus crassus

References

Decapods
Decapod genera